Paathirapattu is a 1967 Indian Malayalam-language horror film, directed and produced by N. Prakash. The film stars Prem Nazir, Sheela, C. R. Lakshmi and G. K. Pillai. The film had musical score by Vijayabhaskar. The film is partially adapted from the 1953 Hollywood film House of Wax.

Cast
Prem Nazir
Sheela
C. R. Lakshmi
G. K. Pillai
Indira Thampi
K. P. Ummer
Mala Aravindan
Nellikode Bhaskaran
K. S. Parvathy

Soundtrack
The music was composed by Vijayabhaskar with lyrics by P. Bhaskaran.

References

External links
 

1967 films
1960s Malayalam-language films